Calliotropis powelli is a species of sea snail, a marine gastropod mollusk in the family Eucyclidae.

Distribution
This marine species is found off the Kermadec Islands.

Footnotes

References
 Marshall B. A. (1979). The Trochidae and Turbinidae of the Kermadec Ridge (Mollusca: Gastropoda). New Zealand Journal of Zoology 6: 521–552-page(s): 529
 Vilvens C. (2007) New records and new species of Calliotropis from Indo-Pacific. Novapex 8 (Hors Série 5): 1–72.

powelli
Gastropods described in 1979